Marcel Erdal (born July 8, 1945) is a linguist and Turkologist, professor and head of the Turcology department at the Goethe University in Frankfurt. He graduated from Robert College (Istanbul) in 1963.

Publications
 The Turkic Nagy-Szent-Miklos Inscription in Greek Letters, 1988
 Old Turkic Word Formation: A Functional Approach to the Lexicon, 1991
 Die Sprache der wolgabolgarischen Inschriften, 1993
 A Grammar of Old Turkic, 2004

References

External links
 Marcel Erdal's Profile at Frankfurt University
Marcel Erdal at WorldCat

Linguists of Turkic languages
Linguists from Germany
Living people
1945 births
Academic staff of Goethe University Frankfurt
Robert College alumni